The dwarf litter-skink (Pygmaeascincus timlowi) is a species of skink found in Queensland in Australia.

References

Pygmaeascincus
Reptiles described in 1977
Skinks of Australia
Endemic fauna of Australia
Taxa named by Glen Joseph Ingram
Reptiles of Queensland